Bäumle is a German surname. Notable people with the surname include:

Artur Bäumle (1906–1943), German athlete
Martin Bäumle (born 1964), Swiss scientist and politician

See also
Baume (surname)

German-language surnames